Konolfingen railway station is a railway station in the municipality of Konolfingen, in the Swiss canton of Bern. It is located at the junction of the standard gauge Bern–Lucerne line of Swiss Federal Railways and the Burgdorf–Thun line of BLS AG.

Services 
 the following services stop at Konolfingen:

References

External links 
 
 

Railway stations in the canton of Bern
Swiss Federal Railways stations